Danzas may refer to:

Danzas, an early name of the DHL Global Forwarding company
Danzas (surname)
Plural of "danza" music form

See also
Danza (disambiguation)